Binbit is a provider of mobile entertainment serving Mexico and countries throughout Asia, Africa, and Central and South America.

History 

Binbit was founded in September 2005 in Monterrey, Mexico, delivering mobile entertainment services internationally. A few months later the company established its first office in Panama, entering the international market, later expanding into  Argentina, Bolivia, Colombia, Chile, Costa Rica, Ecuador, Guatemala, Nicaragua, Peru, Paraguay, and El Salvador.

In 2009, Binbit became the leader in mobile entertainment in Latin America.

Also in 2009, Binbit was nominated in the “Best D2D Service” category for the 2009 Meffys Awards of the Mobile Entertainment Forum.

And by the end of 2009, the company begins operations in two new continents by acquiring Atinco South Africa, and ACME Mobile in Indonesia, Malaysia, Philippines, Singapore, Thailand, and Vietnam.

In 2010 Binbit was operating on three continents and had begun operations in the Dominican Republic and Honduras.

Chronology 
2005 – Foundation
In September 2005, Binbit begins to deliver mobile entertainment services in Mexico.
The company establishes its first international office in Panama a few months later.

2007/2008 – Expansion in Latin America and the U.S.
In just two years, Binbit achieves rapid expansion in Central and South America, both organically and through key acquisitions, starting operations in Nicaragua, Guatemala, Costa Rica, Colombia, Bolivia, Ecuador, Peru, Argentina, Paraguay, Chile, and El Salvador.

2009 – Consolidation in Latin America and expansion to Asia and Africa

Towards the end of 2009, Binbit begins operations in two new continents by the acquisition of Atinco South Africa and ACME Mobile in Southeast Asia, expanding operations to six countries: Singapore, Thailand, Malaysia, Philippines, Indonesia and Vietnam.

2011 - Office in Bangladesh opens

External links 
Official site
 Binbit opens new office in Hong Kong

References 

Multinational companies
Mobile phone companies of Mexico